Marino railway station can refer to:

Marino railway station, Adelaide, a metro station in Adelaide, South Australia
Marino railway station (Northern Ireland), a railway station in Holywood, County Down, Northern Ireland

See also
Maryino (Moscow Metro), a metro station in  Maryino District, South-Eastern Administrative Okrug, Moscow, Russia
Marino (disambiguation)